The eighth government of Francisco Franco was formed on 30 October 1969, after the latter had sacked 13 out of 18 of his ministers—in what was to become the largest cabinet reshuffle in the whole Francoist period—as a result of internal divisions between the various factions within the National Movement and the unveiling of the Matesa scandal earlier that year.

Franco's eighth cabinet was made up of members from the different factions or "families" within the National Movement: mainly the FET y de las JONS party—the only legal political party during the Francoist regime—the military, the Opus Dei and the National Catholic Association of Propagandists (ACNP), as well as a number of aligned-nonpartisan technocrats or figures from the civil service. It would be the last government under the direct control of Franco, as he would give up the post of prime minister to his deputy Luis Carrero Blanco on 9 June 1973.

Council of Ministers
The Council of Ministers was structured into the offices for the prime minister, the deputy prime minister and 19 ministries, including two ministers without portfolio.

Departmental structure
Francisco Franco's eighth government was organised into several superior and governing units, whose number, powers and hierarchical structure varied depending on the ministerial department.

Unit/body rank
() Undersecretary
() Director-general
() Military & intelligence agency

Notes

References

Bibliography

External links
Governments. Dictatorship of Franco (18.07.1936 / 20.11.1975). CCHS–CSIC (in Spanish).
Governments of Franco. Dictatorship Chronology (1939–1975). Fuenterrebollo Portal (in Spanish).
The governments of the Civil War and Franco's dictatorship (1936–1975). Lluís Belenes i Rodríguez History Page (in Spanish).
Biographies. Royal Academy of History (in Spanish).

1969 establishments in Spain
1973 disestablishments in Spain
Cabinets established in 1969
Cabinets disestablished in 1973
Council of Ministers (Spain)